Max Andrews (born February 8, 2004) is an American soccer player who plays as a defender for New York Red Bulls II in the USL Championship via the New York Red Bulls Academy.

Career
Andrews has played with the New York Red Bulls academy since 2018.

During the 2021 USL Championship season Andrews appeared for New York Red Bulls II. He made his debut on June 16, 2021, appearing as an injury-time substitute during a 3–1 win over Charlotte Independence.

He is the founder and owner of Team Bam Bam. 

Andrews has committed to attending the United States Military Academy in 2022 when he has graduated high school.

References

External links 
 

2004 births
Living people
People from Wilton, Connecticut
Wilton High School alumni
American soccer players
New York Red Bulls II players
Association football defenders
Soccer players from Connecticut
USL Championship players
United States men's youth international soccer players
Sportspeople from Fairfield County, Connecticut